Antonio Bravo (12 May 1906 – 28 February 1992) was a Spanish-born Mexican film and television actor. He appeared in more than a hundred and forty productions during a lengthy career.

Selected filmography
 Beautiful Mexico (1938)
 I'm a Real Mexican (1942)
 El Ametralladora (1943)
 The Escape (1944)
 Saint Francis of Assisi (1944)
 Madam Temptation (1948)
 The Great Madcap (1949)
 Philip of Jesus (1949)
 A Galician Dances the Mambo (1951)
 The White Rose (1954)
 The Price of Living (1954)
 Drop the Curtain (1955)
 A Few Drinks (1958)
 El Esqueleto de la señora Morales (1960)
 The Miracle Roses (1960)
 Love in the Shadows (1960)
 My Mother Is Guilty (1960)

References

Bibliography
 Rogelio Agrasánchez, Jr. Guillermo Calles: A Biography of the Actor and Mexican Cinema Pioneer. McFarland, 2010.

External links

1906 births
1992 deaths
Mexican male television actors
Mexican male film actors
Spanish emigrants to Mexico
People from Madrid